The 10th Annual  Honda Civic Tour'' was a concert tour co-headlined by American rock bands Blink-182 and My Chemical Romance (in what turned out to be their final tour until 2019). Joined by supporting acts Matt & Kim, Manchester Orchestra, and Rancid, the tour began on August 5, 2011, and ran until October 8.

Sponsored by the Honda Motor Company, the 2011 tour marked the 10th anniversary of the concert tour, which Blink-182 headlined in its first incarnation.

Background
The tour was announced on May 23, 2011. Both bands had gathered at the Rainbow Bar and Grill in West Hollywood to announce to the tour. Members of the official blink-182 and My Chemical Romance fan clubs had the first chance at tickets to all shows, in an exclusive pre-sale that began on June 6. On June 8, anyone who "liked" the Honda Civic Tour's Facebook page gained access to tickets. All remaining tickets went on sale to the general public on June 10 via Ticketmaster.com and LiveNation.com. The announcement of the tour angered European blink-182 fans, whose previously announced European tour was cancelled just one month before.

As was a tradition with the concert tour, blink-182 was chosen to customize a Honda Civic to commemorate their long collaboration with the tour. Singer-bassist Mark Hoppus, whose first car was a Honda Civic, stated Max Gramajo, who had previously been involved in album artwork and T-shirt designs, co-designed the vehicle. The car featured Koenig rims, Toyo tires, a matte-finish paint job and the blink-182 signature logo, the bunny rabbit (blink-182's mascot) and was handed away during the tour to a fan.

Opening acts
 Manchester Orchestra (until August 23rd)
 Matt & Kim (from September 7th to October 8th)
 Rancid (Auburn, West Valley City, Greenwood Village)
 Alkaline Trio (Wantagh)
 Neon Trees (Des Moines)
 Jimmy Eat World (Tempe)
 H2O (West Valley City)

Setlist

Tour dates

Box office score data

 Music video personnel My Chemical Romance  Frank Iero — rhythm guitar, backing vocals
 Ray Toro — lead guitar, backing vocals
 Gerard Way — lead vocals
 Mikey Way — bass
 James Dewees — Synth, keyboards and percussionAdditional musicians'''
 Michael Pedicone — drums (until September 1)
 Jarrod Alexander — drums (from September 3)

References

External links
My Chemical Romance Official Website
Blink-182 Official Website

2011 concert tours
Blink-182 concert tours
Co-headlining concert tours
My Chemical Romance concert tours